Manhattan Tower is a 1932 American pre-Code film directed by Frank R. Strayer starring Mary Brian and James Hall.

Plot 

Mary Harper and Jimmy Duncan both work at the Empire State Building, he as an engineer, she as a secretary. They would like to marry and buy a house that they saw advertised in a window in the building lobby, but they need more money.

Mary asks her womanizing boss for advice, and he persuades her to give him all her savings to invest. Unbeknownst to her, the boss has speculated in the commodity market, and lost not only his money and that of his wealthy wife, but also some of the firm's funds too. His wife would like to quietly divorce him to marry her politician friend, but the husband asks her for money to avoid a scandal. When Mary changes her mind and asks for the return of her savings, her boss refuses and mistreats her. That causes a confrontation between Jimmy and Mary's boss, and they fight. Meanwhile, the politician and an honest accountant of the firm, who discovered his superior's misdeeds but kept silent, fearing to lose his job, decide to confront Mary's boss. During the fight, he takes a gun from a drawer, and menaces them all. He trips and falls through a window to his death. The witnesses decide to declare it a suicide and go on with their lives.

There are other intertwining stories of people who work at the Empire State Building, and a bank run started by a casual comment by the politician's secretary.

Cast 
Mary Brian as Mary Harper
Irene Rich as Ann Burns
James Hall as Jimmy Duncan
Hale Hamilton as David Witman
Noel Francis as Marge Lyon
Nydia Westman as Miss Wood
Clay Clement as Kenneth Burns
Billy Dooley as Crane Eaton
Jed Prouty as Mr. Hoyt
Wade Boteler as Mr. Ramsay
Walter Brennan as Mechanic (uncredited)

External links 
 
 
 Restored version at Internet Archive

1932 films
1932 drama films
American black-and-white films
Films directed by Frank R. Strayer
Empire State Building in fiction
American drama films
1930s English-language films
1930s American films